The traditional star name Muscida has been applied to:
 ο Ursae Majoris (1 Ursae Majoris), this name is IAU-approved
 π Ursae Majoris, an optical double star consisting of:
 π¹ Ursae Majoris (3 Ursae Majoris)
 π² Ursae Majoris (4 Ursae Majoris)

The name derives from the post classical Latin musus, meaning "snout, or muzzle [of the bear]".

Lists of stars
Ursa Major (constellation)